The 1994 Cheltenham Gold Cup was a horse race which took place at Cheltenham on Thursday 17 March 1994. It was the 67th running of the Cheltenham Gold Cup, and it was won by The Fellow. The winner was ridden by Adam Kondrat and trained by François Doumen. The pre-race favourite Jodami finished second.

The Fellow won the Gold Cup at his fourth attempt, and he was the first ever winner of the race trained in France.

This was to be the final year BBC television broadcast the race.

Race details
 Sponsor: Tote
 Winner's prize money: £118,770.00
 Going: Good
 Number of runners: 15
 Winner's time: 6m 40.7s

Full result

* The distances between the horses are shown in lengths or shorter. shd = short-head; PU = pulled-up; UR = unseated rider.† Trainers are based in Great Britain unless indicated.

Winner's details
Further details of the winner, The Fellow:

 Foaled: 2 May 1985 in France
 Sire: Italic; Dam: L'Oranaise (Paris Jour)
 Owner: Marquesa Soledad de Moratalla
 Breeder: Mlle A. M. Gaulin

References
 
 sportinglife.com
 news.google.co.uk/newspapers – New Straits Times – March 19, 1994.

Cheltenham Gold Cup
 1994
Cheltenham Gold Cup
Cheltenham Gold Cup
1990s in Gloucestershire